"Tragedy" is a song released by the Bee Gees, written by Barry, Robin & Maurice Gibb, included on their 1979 album Spirits Having Flown. The single reached number one in the UK in February 1979 and repeated the feat the following month on the US Billboard Hot 100. In 1998, it was successfully covered by British pop group Steps, whose version also reached number one in the UK.

Origin
Barry, Robin and Maurice Gibb wrote this song and "Too Much Heaven" in an afternoon off from making the Sgt. Pepper's Lonely Hearts Club Band movie, in which they were starring. In the same evening, they wrote "Shadow Dancing", which was performed by Andy Gibb (and reached number one in the US).

Though not originally in Saturday Night Fever, it has subsequently been added to the musical score of the West End version of the movie-musical. The song knocked "I Will Survive" by Gloria Gaynor off the top spot in the US for two weeks before that song again returned to number one for an additional week. "Tragedy" was the second single out of the three released from the album to interrupt a song's stay at #1.

In the US, it would become the fifth of six consecutive number-ones, tying the record with Bing Crosby, Elvis Presley, and the Beatles for most consecutive number-ones in the US--a record later broken by Whitney Houston, who had seven.

Reception
American magazine Billboard felt that the song had similar intensity to "Stayin' Alive" and that it had multiple vocal and instrumental hooks and "graceful" harmonies. Cash Box said it has "vibrant arrangement of synthesizer, guitars, horns, solid beat and dramatic vocals." Record World called it "sizzling" and "up-tempo" and "with some classic progressions, high harmonies and an undercurrent of synthesizers."

Charts

Weekly charts

Year-end charts

Sales and certifications

Steps version

"Tragedy" is a song by British pop group Steps. Issued as a double A-side with "Heartbeat", it was released on 9 November 1998. Initially not included on any album, the song was later included on their second album, Steptacular (1999). "Heartbeat" / "Tragedy" reached number one in the United Kingdom and New Zealand. In the former country, it spent 30 weeks on the UK Singles Chart and sold more copies than all three previous Steps singles combined, with 1.21 million copies sold in the UK. The video for "Tragedy", originally a hit written and performed by the Bee Gees, contained the dance step of putting both hands parallel to the sides of the head in time with the word "tragedy", which became a trademark of the group.

Critical reception
Scottish newspaper Aberdeen Evening Express stated that Steps "did such a sparkling remake" of the song, noting that it "gets [Steptacular] off to a discotastic start". AllMusic editor Jon O'Brien described it as a "triumphant cover". Lucas Villa from AXS wrote that Claire, Faye and Lisa's "powerful performances (coupled with that iconic hands dance step) made "Tragedy" an undeniable dance floor anthem." A reviewer from Daily Record commented, "Once again, Steps have come up with a catchy tune and the reworking of Tragedy has clubbers mimicking the band's dance techniques."

Music video
The accompanying music video for "Tragedy" was directed by David Amphlett. It starts with a Doraemon-shaped alarm clock ringing and sees Faye, Claire, and Lisa getting married. The lads, Lee and H, sabotage all three weddings before they all go to a disco. The church and disco scenes were filmed in All Saints' Church, Harrow Weald, London and the adjoining Blackwell Hall, respectively. The external location shots of the boys leaving their house and driving were filmed in Blackheath, South London. The group's actual families all took part in the video, with the girls' fathers walking them down the aisle, and record producer Pete Waterman appears as the wedding DJ.

Track listings
 UK and Australian CD single
 "Heartbeat" – 4:24
 "Tragedy" – 4:31
 "Heartbeat" (instrumental) – 4:24

 UK cassette single and European CD single
 "Heartbeat" – 4:24
 "Tragedy" – 4:31

 US CD and cassette single
 "Tragedy" (LP version) – 4:30
 "Stay with Me" – 4:04

Credits and personnel
Credits are adapted from the liner notes of Steptacular.

Recording
 Recorded at PWL Studios, Manchester in 1998
 Mixed at PWL Studios, Manchester
 Mastered at Transfermation Studios, London

Vocals
 Lead vocals – Claire Richards, Faye Tozer
 Background vocals – Lisa Scott-Lee, Lee Latchford-Evans, Ian "H" Watkins

Personnel
 Songwriting – Barry, Robin and Maurice Gibb
 Production – Mark Topham, Karl Twigg, Pete Waterman
 Mixing – Dan Frampton, Pete Waterman
 Engineer – Chris McDonnell
 Drums – Chris McDonnell
 Keyboards – Karl Twigg
 Guitars – Mark Topham

Charts

Weekly charts

Year-end charts

Certifications

Release history

Foo Fighters version
In 2021, American rock band Foo Fighters, under their alter ego, the 'Dee Gees', covered the song for their album Hail Satin.

See also
List of Hot 100 number-one singles of 1979 (U.S.)
List of million-selling singles in the United Kingdom
List of UK Singles Chart number ones of the 1970s

References

1979 songs
1979 singles
1998 singles
Bee Gees songs
British disco songs
Billboard Hot 100 number-one singles
Cashbox number-one singles
European Hot 100 Singles number-one singles
RSO Records singles
Songs written by Barry Gibb
Songs written by Maurice Gibb
Songs written by Robin Gibb
Song recordings produced by Barry Gibb
Song recordings produced by Robin Gibb
Song recordings produced by Maurice Gibb
Steps (group) songs
Foo Fighters songs
UK Singles Chart number-one singles
RPM Top Singles number-one singles
Number-one singles in New Zealand